Hearts on Fire is Baker Gurvitz Army's third and last studio album, released in 1976.

Track listing
"Hearts on Fire" (Ginger Baker) – 2:32
"Neon Lights" (Mr. Snips) – 4:38
"Smiling" (Paul Gurvitz) – 3:16
"Tracks of My Life" (Adrian Gurvitz) – 4:30
"Flying in and Out of Stardom" (A. Gurvitz) – 2:21
"Dancing the Night Away" (A. Gurvitz) – 3:26
"My Mind Is Healing" (A. Gurvitz) 3:54
"Thirsty for the Blues" (A. Gurvitz) – 5:18
"Night People" (A. Gurvitz) – 3:21
"Mystery" (Snips) – 4:04

Personnel
Baker Gurvitz Army
Ginger Baker - drums, percussion, vocals
Adrian Gurvitz -	guitar, vocals 
Paul Gurvitz - bass, vocals
Mr. Snips - vocals
John Norman Mitchell - keyboards, synthesizer, vibes
Madeline Bell, Rosetta Hightower, Barry St. John, Lisa Strike - backing vocals on track 5
Madeline Bell -	 backing vocals 
Irene Chanter -	backing vocals
Kay Garner -	backing vocals
Brian Chatton	- Clavinet, mini Moog
Ken Freeman -	synthesizer strings
Ann Odell -	piano, Hammond organ
Technical
Produced by Eddie Offord
Recorded at Ramport Studios
Engineer : Cyrano
Mixed at Trident Studios and Island Studios
Engineer : Anton Matthews

References

1974 albums
Baker Gurvitz Army albums
Vertigo Records albums
Albums produced by Eddy Offord